Diplozoidae is a family of monogeneans in the order Mazocraeidea.  In all species of this family, the bodies of the two hermaphroditic members of a couple are permanently fused for life. These monogeneans are parasitic on the gills of freshwater fish.

Genera
Afrodiplozoon Khotenovsky, 1981
Diplozoon von Nordmann, 1832 Example of species: Diplozoon paradoxum
Neodiplozoon Tripathi, 1960
Paradiplozoon Akhmerov, 1974. Example of species: Paradiplozoon hemiculteri, Paradiplozoon yunnanense.

References

Polyopisthocotylea
Platyhelminthes families
Parasites of fish